Loch Trool is a narrow, freshwater loch in Galloway, in the Southern Uplands in south-west Scotland. The loch is the source of the Water of Trool which flows to the Water of Minnoch and the River Cree. There is a walking trail and footpath around the loch's perimeter.

In April 1307 Robert the Bruce fought and won the Battle of Glen Trool on the shores of the loch.  On its north side stands Bruce's Stone which commemorates the victory.

Loch Trool is also reported to be the darkest place in the UK at night.

Survey
The loch was surveyed in 1903 by James Murray and later charted  as part of Sir John Murray's Bathymetrical Survey of Fresh-Water Lochs of Scotland 1897-1909.

References

Lochs of Dumfries and Galloway
Freshwater lochs of Scotland